Tanytarsus reei is a species of fly belonging to the family Chironomidae (non-biting midges). This is a rather small yellowish species with dark brown markings on the thorax, discovered close to Namyangju in South Korea. The specific name honours the Korean entomologist Han Il Ree.

References

Chironomidae
Insects described in 2010